The 3d Space Support Wing (3 SSW) was a wing of the United States Air Force active from 1986 to 1992 at Peterson Air Force Base, Colorado as part of Air Force Space Command.

History
The wing was constituted as the 3d Space Support Wing on 8 Oct 1986 and activated on 15 Oct 1986.

It was inactivated on 15 May 1992 along with the 1st Space Wing.  The 21st Space Wing, a unit with a more historic lineage, took their place.

Components
 Cheyenne Mountain Support Group
 USAF Clinic, Peterson AFB
 1003d Civil Engineering Squadron
 1003d Comptroller Squadron
 1003d Mission Support Squadron
 1003d Mobile Command and Control Squadron
 1003d Security Police Squadron
 1003d Services Squadron
 1003d Space Support Group
 1003d Transportation Squadron
 1004th Space Support Group
 1012th Air Base Group
 1015th Air Base Squadron
 2163d Communications Group

Emblem

Blazon
Azure, resting on a pillar issuing from base or, detailed argent, a globe celeste (blue turquoise) grid-lined of the second and outlined of the third within two orbital rings saltirewise of the like each charged in chief with a polestar gold; all between three mullets and a plate argent, the plate in dexter chief; all within a diminished bordure or.

Symbolism
Blue and yellow are the Air Force colors.  Blue alludes to the sky, the primary theater of Air Force operations.  Yellow refers to the sun and the excellence required of Air Force personnel.  The globe represents the earth as viewed from space.  The latitude and longitude lines emphasize the global nature of Air Force space operations.  The ellipses and stars represent the orbital paths traced by satellites.  The pillar represents the support mission of the wing.

See also
 1st Space Wing
 2d Space Wing

References

Organizations based in Colorado Springs, Colorado
Space wings of the United States Air Force
Military units and formations established in 1986
Military units and formations disestablished in 1992